Carl Duane Pursell (December 19, 1932 – June 11, 2009) was an American politician of the Republican Party.

He was born in Imlay City, Michigan and graduated from Plymouth High School, Plymouth, Michigan, in 1951. He worked in his father's business and served in the United States Army from 1957 to 1959. In 1957 and 1961, he earned degrees from Eastern Michigan University, where he was also a member of the Tau Kappa Epsilon fraternity. He received an alumnus achievement award in 1974 and a distinguished alumnus award in 1990.

In 1969, Pursell ran successfully for a seat as Wayne County Commissioner. He left this position in 1971, after being elected from the 14th District to the Michigan Senate, serving from 1971 to 1977. Pursell was elected as a Republican from Michigan's 2nd congressional district to the United States House of Representatives. He served in the 95th Congress and to the seven succeeding Congresses, serving from January 3, 1977, until his retiring from Congress on January 3, 1993. A moderate, he served as ranking member of the Appropriations Subcommittee on Education.

Pursell served as regent of Eastern Michigan University from 1993 to 1999. He died at his home at the age of 76.

References

External links

The Political Graveyard
 

1932 births
2009 deaths
American Protestants
County commissioners in Michigan
Eastern Michigan University alumni
Republican Party Michigan state senators
People from Imlay City, Michigan
United States Army soldiers
Republican Party members of the United States House of Representatives from Michigan
20th-century American politicians